Pinger, Inc. is a US Telecom provider for free texts, pictures, calls, and voicemails. Pinger was founded in 2005 by former Palm, Inc. managers Greg Woock (CEO of Pinger, Inc) and Joe Sipher.  The company was founded in 2006 and is headquartered in San Jose, California.

Products 
The company has released several apps, mostly being available on  iOS, Android, Microsoft Windows and Macintosh.

Textfree 

Textfree is an app that allows user to call and text using a real phone number for free. The app has a free ad-supported version and a paid version. The app allows you to text anyone in the world.

Sideline 
Sideline is an app that adds a second phone number to your phone using technology similar to Textfree. It's available for  iOS, Android, Microsoft Windows and Macintosh. Their official website is sideline.com.

References

External links

March 27, 2013 The Wall Street Journal. The Messaging Apps Taking on Facebook, Phone Giants
 March 19, 2013 CNN Money Turn your iPad into a free phone
 March 17, 2011 Biz Journals Pinger aims to dominate texting world

Company products
 Sideline - second phone number
 Textfree - free texting and calling

Software development